The Drunken Canal was a New York-based print newspaper. The publication was founded in 2020 by Michelle "Gutes" Guterman and Claire Banse. The newspaper focused on the happenings of young and creative people living in the Dimes Square neighborhood of New York's Lower East Side.

Overview
In a New York Times article by Ben Smith, the publication was cited as a pushback against the homogenization of social media platforms. Articles published in the paper include an interview between Cat Marnell and Caroline Calloway. Its September 2021 issue was shot by Daniel Arnold and outfitted by Thom Browne. The paper partnered with the Tribeca Festival to produce a Battle of the Bands event judged by Nick Sansano and Despot.

The newspaper published its final issue in 2022.

Advertisers
Numerous local businesses and personalities such as Nimrod Kamer bought ads on the Canal throughout its run.

References

Magazines established in 2020
Magazines published in New York City
Fashion magazines published in the United States
2020 establishments in New York City
2022 disestablishments in New York (state)